Say Piseth (born 4 August 1990 in Phnom Penh, Cambodia) is a Cambodian footballer who plays for home town club National Police Commissary in Cambodian League.

He has represented Cambodia at senior international level.

References

External links
 

1990 births
Living people
Cambodian footballers
Cambodia international footballers
People from Kandal province
Association football defenders